Sir Edward Knatchbull, 4th Baronet (c. 1674 – 3 April 1730) was an English politician who sat in the House of Commons of England from 1702 to 1705 and in the House of Commons of Great Britain variously between 1713 and 1730.

Knatchbull was the eldest son of Sir Thomas Knatchbull, 3rd Baronet and his wife Mary Dering, daughter of Sir Edward Dering, 2nd Baronet.

In 1702, Knatchbull was elected Member of Parliament for Rochester and held the seat to 1705. In 1712, he succeeded his father in the baronetcy. In 1713, he was elected MP for Kent and represented the constituency until 1715. He was elected MP for Kent again in 1722 and held the seat until 1727. In the following year, he was returned for Lostwithiel, a seat he held until his death on 3 April 1730.

Knatchbull married Alice Wyndham, daughter of Colonel John Wyndham and sister of Thomas Wyndham, 1st Baron Wyndham before 1698. They had eight children, three daughters and five sons. Knatchbull died at Golden Square in Middlesex and was succeeded in the baronetcy by his oldest son Sir Wyndham Knatchbull-Wyndham, 6th Baronet. His second son Edward sat in the Irish House of Commons and became later the 7th Baronet.

References

1670s births
1730 deaths
Edward
Baronets in the Baronetage of England
British MPs 1713–1715
British MPs 1722–1727
British MPs 1727–1734
Members of the Parliament of Great Britain for English constituencies
English MPs 1702–1705
Members of the Parliament of Great Britain for Lostwithiel